The Buzo Tactico Assault Vest was a webbing equipment used by the Argentine Buzos Tácticos at the end of the Junta era and in the Falklands War.

References

Personal military carrying equipment
Military equipment of Argentina